Planet Snoopy is a Peanuts themed area for children at several Cedar Fair amusement parks.

Locations

Current

Planet Snoopy at Kings Island was awarded the "Best Kids Area" Golden Ticket Awards from 2001–2018 by Amusement Today.

Former

Rides

 California's Great America: Character Carousel, Flying Ace, GR8 SK8, Joe Cool's Dodgem School, Kite Eating Tree, Lucy's Crabbie Cabbies, PEANUTS 500, PEANUTS Pirates, Planet Snoopy Construction Zone, Sally's Love Buggies, Sally's Swing Set, Snoopy's Space Buggies, Snoopy's Space Race, The Pumpkin Patch, Woodstock Express
 Canada's Wonderland: Beagle Brigade Airfield, Boo Blasters on Boo Hill, Character Carousel, Ghoster Coaster, Joe Cool's Dodgem School, Lucy's Tugboat, PEANUTS 500, Sally's Love Buggies, Snoopy vs. Red Baron, Snoopy's Racing Railway, Snoopy's Revolution, Snoopy's Space Race, Swan Lake, The Pumpkin Patch, Woodstock Whirlybirds
 Cedar Point: Flying Ace Balloon Race, Joe Cool's Dodgem School, Kite Eating Tree, PEANUTS Road Rally, Snoopy's Deep Sea Divers, Snoopy's Space Race, Snoopy's Express Railroad, Woodstock Whirlybirds
 Dorney Park & Wildwater Kingdom: Camp Bus, Charlie Brown's Wind-Up, Flying Ace, Flying Ace Balloon Race, Kite Eating Tree, Linus Launcher, PEANUTS 500, PEANUTS Road Rally, Sally's Swing Set, Snoopy's Cloud Climbers, Snoopy's Junction, Snoopy's Rocket Express, Woodstock Express, Woodstock Whirlybirds, Woodstock's Wagon Wheel
 Kings Dominion: Boo Blasters on Boo Hill, Charlie Brown's Wind Up, Flying Ace, Flying Ace Balloon Race, Great Pumpkin Coaster, Joe Cool's Driving School, Kite Eating Tree, Linus Launcher, Lucy's Crabbie Cabbies, Lucy's Tugboat, PEANUTS 500, PEANUTS Road Rally, PEANUTS Turnpike, Sally's Sea Plane, Snoopy vs. Red Baron, Snoopy's Junction, Snoopy's Rocket Express, Snoopy's Space Buggies, Woodstock Express, Woodstock Whirlybirds
 Kings Island: Boo Blasters on Boo Hill, Character Carousel, Charlie Brown's Wind Up, Flying Ace Aerial Chase, Joe Cool's Dodgem School, Kite Eating Tree, Linus’ Beetle Bugs, Linus’ Launcher, PEANUTS 500, Peanuts Off-Road Rally, Race For Your Life Charlie Brown, Sally's Sea Plane, Snoopy vs. Red Baron, Snoopy's Junction, Snoopy's Space Buggies, Surf Dog, The Great Pumpkin Coaster, Woodstock Express, Woodstock Gliders, Woodstock Whirlybirds
 Valleyfair: Charlie Brown's Wind-Up, Cosmic Coaster, Flying Ace Balloon Race, Kite Eating Tree, Linus Launcher, Linus’ Beetle Bugs, Lucy's Tugboat, PEANUTS 500, PEANUTS Playhouse, PEANUTS Road Rally, Sally's Swing Set, Snoopy vs. Red Baron, Snoopy's Deep Sea Divers, Snoopy's Junction, Snoopy's Rocket Express, Woodstock Whirlybirds
 Worlds of Fun: Beagle Brigade Airfield, Camp Bus, Charlie Brown's Wind-Up, Cosmic Coaster, Flying Ace Balloon Race, Kite Eating Tree, Linus’ Launcher, Lucy's Tugboat, PEANUTS 500, PEANUTS Playhouse, PEANUTS Road Rally, Sally's Swing Set, Snoopy vs. Red Baron, Snoopy's Junction, Snoopy's Space Buggies, Woodstock Gliders, Woodstock Whirlybirds

See also
 2013 in amusement parks

References

External links

 Planet Snoopy at California's Great America
 Planet Snoopy at Carowinds
 Planet Snoopy at Dorney Park & Wildwater Kingdom
 Planet Snoopy at Kings Dominion
 Planet Snoopy at Kings Island
 Planet Snoopy at Valleyfair
 Planet Snoopy at Worlds of Fun

Cedar Fair attractions
Amusement rides introduced in 2008
Amusement rides introduced in 2010
Amusement rides introduced in 2011
Canada's Wonderland
California's Great America
Cedar Point
Dorney Park & Wildwater Kingdom
Kings Dominion
Kings Island
Worlds of Fun
Valleyfair
Peanuts in amusement parks
Themed areas in Cedar Fair amusement parks